Father's Day (German: Vatertag) is a 1955 West German comedy film directed by Hans Richter and starring Grethe Weiser, Paul Westermeier and Camilla Spira.  It was shot at the Wandsbek Studios in Hamburg and on location around the city. The film's sets were designed by the art directors Mathias Matthies and Ellen Schmidt.

Synopsis
The wives of several respectable town members are concerned that their husbands are spending time secretively with some attractive female dancers. What they don't realise is that they are in fact in training for a dance competition.

Cast
 Grethe Weiser as Thea Brause
 Paul Westermeier as 	Paul Brause
 Camilla Spira as 	Berta Helbig
 Willy Reichert as 	Gustav Helbig
 Blandine Ebinger as 	Hermine v. Streitwitz
 Ernst Waldow as 	Major von Streitwitz
 Lotte Rausch as 	Lucie Novotny
 Günther Lüders as Franz Novotny
 Ursula Grabley as 	Eva Kugel
 Jupp Hussels as Adam Kugel
 Maria Sebaldt as Gerti Brause
 Peter W. Staub as 	Egon Kammerhahn
 Ingrid Lutz as 	Marion Werner
 Joachim Rake as 	Michaelis

References

Bibliography
 Bock, Hans-Michael & Bergfelder, Tim. The Concise CineGraph. Encyclopedia of German Cinema. Berghahn Books, 2009.
 Jaedicke, Horst . Willy Reichert: Er wollte alles, ausser Schwäbisch ; eine Biographie. Hohenheim, 2010.

External links 
 

1955 films
1955 comedy films
German comedy films
West German films
1950s German-language films
Films directed by Hans Richter
1950s German films
Films shot at Wandsbek Studios
Films shot in Hamburg

de:Vatertag (1955)